J&L Books is a small, highly selective art press that publishes 3–5 books per year. It is a non-profit organisation based in Atlanta and in New York City. The press was founded and is run by Jason Fulford and Leanne Shapton. Fulford is a publisher, editor and book designer.

Primarily, J&L publishes books of photography, but also publishes books of drawing, fiction, non-fiction, and video art in DVD-form. Among the artists published by J&L are Harrell Fletcher, Bertrand Fleuret, Gregory Halpern, Corin Hewitt, Amy O'Neill, Ed Panar, Gus Powell, Michael Schmelling and Mike Slack.

References

External links 
 

Book publishing companies based in New York (state)
Visual arts publishing companies
Photography companies of the United States